Pomacea scalaris is a species of freshwater snail of the Ampullariidae (common name "apple snail") family, described by Alcide d'Orbigny in 1835.

References

 Simone, L. R. L. (2006). Land and Freshwater Molluscs of Brazil. Editora Grafíca Bernardi, FAPESP. São Paulo, 390 pp.

External links
 Cowie R.H. & Thiengo S.C. (2003). The apple snails of the Americas (Mollusca: Gastropoda: Ampullariidae: Asolene, Felipponea, Marisa, Pomacea, Pomella): A nomenclatural and type catalog. Malacologia. 45(1): 41-100
 MNHN, Paris: syntype

scalaris
Species described in 1835